Leucopogon bossiaea is a species of flowering plant in the heath family Ericaceae and is endemic to a restricted area in the south-west of Western Australia. It is an erect shrub with elliptic to broadly egg-shaped leaves and white flowers in four to eleven upper leaf axils.

Description

Taxonomy and naming
This species was first formally described in 1867 by Ferdinand von Mueller who gave it the name Styphelia bossiaea in Fragmenta Phytographiae Australiae from specimens collected by George Maxwell. In 1868, George Bentham changed the name to Leucopogon bossiaea in Flora Australiensis. The specific epithet (bossiaea) is a reference to the genus Bossiaea.

Distribution and habitat
This leucopogon usually grows in mallee woodlands or heath but is only known from near Israelite Bay in the Esperance plains bioregion in the south-west of Western Australia.

Conservation status
Leucopogon borealis is classified as "Priority Two" by the Western Australian Government Department of Biodiversity, Conservation and Attractions, meaning that it is poorly known and from only one or a few locations.

References

bossiaea
Ericales of Australia
Flora of Western Australia
Plants described in 1867
Taxa named by Ferdinand von Mueller